The 1950 Polish Speedway season was the 1950 season of motorcycle speedway in Poland.

Individual

Polish Individual Speedway Championship
The 1950 Individual Speedway Polish Championship was held in Kraków on 8 October.

Result and heat detals

E – retired or mechanical failure •
F – fell •
N – non-starter

Team Speedway Polish Championship
The 1950 Team Speedway Polish Championship was the third edition of the Team Polish Championship.

Rules 
In First and Second League, matches were played with part three teams. It made up team four riders plus one reserve.  Events consisted of 12 races. In one day were played three three-cornered matches. For winning a match a team received 3 points, for second place 2 points and for third 1 point. In every heat the score was 4–3–2–1 and 0 in a no-completion heat. The drivers with main squad of a team started in the match four times. The quantity of small points was added up.

First League 

Medalists

Second League

References

Poland Individual
Poland Team
Speedway